Syrmoptera amasa, the white false head, is a butterfly in the family Lycaenidae. It is found in Nigeria (east and the Cross River loop), Cameroon and Gabon. The habitat consists of forests.

References

External links
Die Gross-Schmetterlinge der Erde 13: Die Afrikanischen Tagfalter. Plate XIII 66 h

Butterflies described in 1869
Theclinae
Butterflies of Africa
Taxa named by William Chapman Hewitson